Irene Gauthier (1920-2010) was an American massage therapist.

She was born Irene Eleanor Simonen on June 20th, 1920. She was a highly regarded massage therapist and massage therapy instructor. She worked to develop massage into a respected trade and raise the massage profession to align with health care in the United States. She continued working until she died at the age of 90.

Biography
Irene (Simonen) Gauthier was born to Finnish immigrants in Pelkie, Michigan in the Upper Peninsula. After High School, she moved to attend beauty school Detroit in 1938. She became licensed as a cosmetologist by the state of Michigan in 1939. By 1947 she owned her own beauty parlor, Rene's, on West McNichols in Detroit. After an asthma attack two years later she started learning about natural healing techniques. In 1957, she began to formally study Swedish Massage at the Steam Baths on Grand River Avenue in Detroit.

Gauthier began practicing foot reflexology massage on her cosmetology clients as they sat under the hairdryer. After obtaining a portable massage table she made house calls to practice massage therapy. She closed her beauty parlor and combined her cosmetology career with massage therapy in her own basement.  

Ten years into her career, in 1968, Irene won the American Massage Therapy Association (AMTA) Member of the Year Award. Two years later she helped found both the International Myomassethics Federation  and the Michigan Myomassologist Association. 

Irene continued as a student throughout life. In 1975 she studied under the Touch for Health Foundation in Pasadena, California and became a Touch for Health instructor in 1976. In 1981 she received a certificate in Polarity Therapy from Dr. Said. She also studied basic, intermediate, and advanced Craniosacral therapy from Dr. John Upledger of the Upledger Institute in Palm Springs, Florida.

Her first four students learned massage in Irene's basement. Classes successfully continued there until 1987 when she opened her first state-licensed school, The Myomassethics Center. Two years later, in 1989, Irene wrote the book, "The Science and Practice of Myomassology". The book was added to the curriculum and is still in use at her institute.  Her massage therapy techniques were filmed in 1999 making a companion video to her textbook.  

Irene's Myomassology Institute, named after Irene herself, opened in 1993 with her daughter Kathleen. The original location was expanded four times but ultimately became too small as the school's success continued. In May 2000, construction of a new building for Irene's campus began. In 2002 the 17,000 square foot facility had its grand opening.

At the age of 82, Irene continued to teach students at the institute. Through her work there, and at various workshops around the world she was able to help create a better understanding of health through massage therapy and holistic health practices. She received multiple awards including a Certificate of Tribute from then Michigan Governor Jennifer Granholm and a Certificate of Tribute from then Mayor of Southfield Brenda Lawrence in 2009, and a joint resolution for her many contributions both locally and globally on June 18, 2010, from the Mayor of Southfield and the City Council.

Celebrating her 90th birthday, Irene's staff held an event to break the world record for longest massage chain ever. Although this goal was accomplished with 1108 participants, the record was soon thereafter claimed by an energy drink company in Thailand.  Through most of that year, Irene continued to work at her school as both a massage instructor and a massage therapist. She was often found assisting with clients as a supervisor in the shool's student massage clinic.  Later that year, on October 25th, she died of congestive heart failure.

In 2012, Irene Gauthier was inducted into the Massage Therapy Hall of Fame in recognition of her contributions to the art and science of massage therapy at the World Massage Festival. The school Irene had founded also won the Best of Detroit award from Hour Detroit. The following year it went on to win Massage School of the Year.

Throughout her life, Irene sponsored children through Plan USA. She asked for donations to the nonprofit instead of flowers, and to this day the school's website still provides a way to donate to the charity in her memory.

References 

1920 births
2010 deaths
Masseurs
People in alternative medicine
People from Baraga County, Michigan
People from Detroit